Aleksandr Georgyevich Yaroshuk (born 15 November 1965) is a Russian politician. He has represented the legislative power, the Kaliningrad Oblast Duma, of Kaliningrad Oblast in the Federation Council since 21 October 2021. He was previously a member of the State Duma for Kaliningrad's Central constituency between 2018 and 2021, having been returned in a 2018 by-election.

Career 
Yaroshuk was mayor of Kaliningrad from 2012 to 2018. On 21 October 2021, Yaroshuk was elected by the Kaliningrad Oblast Duma to represent the oblast's legislative body on the Federation Council.

References 

1965 births
Living people
People from Kaliningrad
United Russia politicians
21st-century Russian politicians
Seventh convocation members of the State Duma (Russian Federation)
Members of the Federation Council of Russia (after 2000)
Mayors of Kaliningrad